Hendrik Alexander Seyffardt (1 November 1872 – 6 February 1943) was a Dutch general, who during World War II collaborated with Nazi Germany during the occupation of the Netherlands, most notably as a figurehead of the Dutch Legion, a unit of the Waffen-SS on the Eastern Front.

Early life
Like his father, he chose a career as a professional soldier, and so at the age of fifteen he became a cadet at the Koninklijke Militaire Academie (KMA) in Breda. On graduation he was appointed second lieutenant at the Vestingartillerie (garrison artillery) in the Royal Netherlands Army, but returned to the KMA as a lecturer in 1900 at the age of 28. Alongside his teaching he studied at the Hogere Krijgsschool in Haarlem, in order to become qualified for a position within the General Staff. In 1928, as an interim step, he was appointed commander of the first division in the rank of Major General. A year later he was appointed Chief of the General Staff, promoted to lieutenant general a year later, remaining as chief of the General Staff latterly attached to the Central Intelligence (CI), part of GS III. He retired in May 1934, after a very meritorious career.

Nationalist sympathies
In the build-up to World War II, he began to give lectures for the conservative Verbond voor Nationaal Herstel (Alliance for National Recovery - VNH) led by Van Gybland Oosterhoff. In 1937, Seyffardt became a member of the Nationaal-Socialistische Beweging (NSB), and started writing articles for their publication Volk en Vaderland. But after a year and a half, disillusioned with the infighting between Anton Mussert and Meinoud Rost van Tonningen, he resigned his membership. In October 1940 he attended a meeting of a Fascist group organised around the magazine De Waag.

Vrijwilligers Legioen Nederland

On 28 June 1941, Arnold Meyer of the strongly anti-Semitic and fascist Nationaal Front party made a proposal in Nederlandsch Dagblad, pleading for a joint establishment of a separate Dutch Legion that would take part in the fight against "the Russian Bolshevism”. After internal opposition within the Dutch leadership, on 5 July 1941 Hitler officially approved the establishment of a Dutch volunteer SS group, and after being approached unofficially Seyffardt was officially appointed head of the Legion on 8 July by Reichskommissar Arthur Seyss-Inquart. Seyffardt, a nationalist and fierce anti-communist, saw his immediate political and power gain. 

However, it must have been clear to the 69-year-old general from the start that he was but a figurehead, only in charge of the regional headquarters of the Vrijwilligers Legioen Nederland, as the formation was named. This was solely responsible for enlisting recruits and for social assistance to the Legion soldiers and their families. SS-Standartenführer Otto Reich, while A.R. Kleijn was appointed chief of staff to Seyffardt. The second unit formed was the 23rd SS Volunteer Panzer Grenadier Division Nederland in February 1941. After training in Hamburg and East Prussia, in November 1941 it was ordered to the Eastern Front near Leningrad, under the overall command of Army Group North. The division served alongside their Nazi allies, but suffered heavy losses. However, Seyffardt's input and contribution was systematically ignored by the German SS authorities. After rejoining the NSB, in March 1942 he submitted his resignation to Seyss-Inquart and SS Obergruppenführer Hanns Albin Rauter, but was persuaded to stay.

Death

After Hitler had approved Anton Mussert as "Leider van het Nederlandse Volk" (Leader of the Dutch People) in December 1942, he was allowed to form a national government institute, a Dutch shadow cabinet called "Gemachtigden van den Leider", which would advise Seyss-Inquart from 1 February 1943. The institute would consist of a number of deputies in charge of defined functions or departments within the administration, and on 4 February Seyffardt was appointed “Deputy for special services”, announced through the press.

As a result, the Dutch communist resistance group CS-6 under Dr. Gerrit Kastein, concluded that the new institute would eventually lead to a National-Socialist government, which would then introduce general conscription to enable the call-up of Dutch nationals to the Eastern Front. However, in reality, the Nazis only saw Mussert and the NSB as a useful Dutch tool to enable general co-operation, and Seyss-Inquart had further assured Mussert post his December 1942 meeting with Hitler that general conscription was not on the agenda. However, CS-6 assessed that Seyffardt was the first person eligible for an attack, after the heavily protected Mussert.

After approval from the Dutch government in exile, on the evening of Friday 5 February 1943, after answering a knock at his front door in Scheveningen, The Hague Seyffardt was shot twice by student Jan Verleun who had accompanied Dr. Kastein on the mission. A day later Seyffardt succumbed to his wounds in hospital. A private military ceremony was arranged at the Binnenhof, The Hague attended by family and friends and with Mussert in attendance, after which he was cremated. Verleun was executed on 7 January 1944. On 7 February, CS-6 shot fellow institute member “Gemachtigde voor de Volksvoorlichting” (Attorney for the national relations) H. Reydon and his wife. His wife died on the spot, while Reydon died on 24 August of his wounds. The gun used in this attack had been given to Dr. Kastein by Sicherheitsdienst (SD) agent Van der Waals, and after tracking him back through information, arrested him on 19 February. Two days later Dr. Kastein committed suicide so as not to give away Dutch Resistance information under torture. Seyffardt and Reydon's deaths led to massive Nazi reprisals in the occupied Netherlands, under Operation Silbertanne.

Memorial
In Seyffardt's honor, a unit of Dutch volunteers on the Eastern Front was renamed 48. Freiwilligen SS-Panzergrenadier-Regiment General Seyffardt.

References

1872 births
1943 deaths
Royal Netherlands Army generals
Royal Netherlands Army officers
Dutch fascists
Dutch people of World War II
Deaths by firearm in the Netherlands
Graduates of the Koninklijke Militaire Academie
People from Breda
SS-Brigadeführer
Assassinated Nazis
Assassinated military personnel
National Socialist Movement in the Netherlands politicians
1943 crimes in the Netherlands
1943 murders in Europe
Dutch Waffen-SS personnel